The 2017 NCAA Division I men's soccer season was the 59th season of NCAA championship men's college soccer.  The regular season began on August 25 and continued into the first weekend of November 2017. The season culminated with the 2017 NCAA Division I Men's Soccer Championship and the four-team College Cup finals at Talen Energy Stadium in Chester, Pennsylvania, December 8–10. There were 205 teams in men's Division I competition. The two-time defending champions, the Stanford Cardinal, won their third consecutive championship by downing the previously undefeated Indiana Hoosiers 1–0 in double overtime.

Changes from 2016

Coaching changes

New programs 
The California Baptist Lancers have been approved to begin the transition from Division II to Division I and the Western Athletic Conference in 2018–19.

Discontinued programs 

Buffalo discontinued men's soccer and three other sports in April 2017 for financial reasons.

Conference realignment 

 † = The SIU Edwardsville Cougars were initially announced as replacing Buffalo for 2018 and beyond, but less than a week after the first announcement, the timetable for SIU Edwardsville's entry was accelerated to 2017.
 The 2017 season will be the last for Belmont as an associate in Horizon League men's soccer. The team will join the Southern Conference for 2018 and beyond.

NCAA Top 10 Ranking
On October 11, the NCAA announced that, for the first time, the Division I Men's Soccer Committee would announce a Top 10 Ranking well ahead of the announcement of the tournament field and seeding. The announcement was scheduled for Sunday, October 29 during halftime of the nationally televised game between Indiana and Michigan State and is to designed give the public a sneak peek of the committee's thought process. Bill Wnek, chair of the committee and associate director of athletics at Loyola Maryland stated that, “With 75 percent of the season complete by that point, this will be a great exercise for our committee as we prepare for selection Monday.”

The ranking is to be based on the same criteria used to select and seed the 48 teams for the Division I Men's Soccer Championship, including strength of schedule, Rating Percentage Index, head-to-head competition, results versus common opponents, significant wins and losses, and locations of contests with additional input provided by the regional advisory committees.

Season overview

Pre-season polls

Regular season 
The regular season will begin on August 25, 2017 and end in early November 2017.

#1

Top 10 Ranking
On Sunday, October 29 during halftime of the nationally televised game between Indiana and Michigan State, the Division I Men's Soccer Committee announced its first-ever NCAA Top 10 Ranking. (See details above.)

Conference standings

Major upsets 
In this list, a "major upset" is defined as a game won by a team ranked 10 or more spots lower or an unranked team that defeats a team ranked #15 or higher.

Conference winners and tournaments

Statistics

Individuals

Last update on 13 December 2017Last update on 13 December 2017

Last update on 13 December 2017Last update on 13 December 2017

Last update on 13 December 2017Last update on 13 December 2017
 Individual statistics are through the games of 10 December 2017.

Teams
Last update on 13 December 2017Last update on 13 December 2017

Last update on 13 December 2017

Team statistics are through the games of  10 December 2017.Last update on 13 December 2017

Awards and honors

Hermann Trophy 
 The Hermann Trophy is given to the year's most outstanding player. Finalists:
 Jon Bakero (FW), Wake Forest
 Tomas Hilliard-Arce (DF), Stanford
 Grant Lillard (DF), Indiana

Senior CLASS Award 

 The Senior CLASS Award is presented each year to the most outstanding senior NCAA Division I. Finalists:
 Jon Bakero (FW), Wake Forest
 Fraser Colmer (DF), Radford
 Jimmy Fiscus (DF), Michigan State
 Foster Langsdorf (FW), Stanford
 Wyatt Omsberg (DF), Dartmouth

All-Americans

On December 7, 2017, United Soccer Coaches announced their All-America teams, broken into three starting XI's.

♦ = Additionally, the United Soccer Coaches named Western Michigan's Brandon Bye as the 2017 NCAA Men's Soccer Division I Scholar Player of the Year.		.

Coaches
United Soccer Coaches College Coach of the Year: Jeremy Gunn, Stanford

See also 
 College soccer
 List of NCAA Division I men's soccer programs
 2017 in American soccer
 2017 NCAA Division I Men's Soccer Championship
 2017 NCAA Division I women's soccer season

References 

 
NCAA